The Keystone B-6 was a biplane bomber developed by the Keystone Aircraft company for the United States Army Air Corps.

Design and development
In 1931, the United States Army Air Corps received five working models (Y1B-6s) of the B-6 bomber. The Y1B- designation, as opposed to a YB- designation, indicates funding outside normal fiscal year procurement. Two of these were redesignations of LB-13s; three were re-engined B-3As. The Air Corps placed an order for 39 production models on 28 April 1931, with deliveries between August 1931 and January 1932.

At the same time, an order was placed for 25 B-4As, the same aircraft but mounting Pratt & Whitney engines instead of Wright Cyclones. Despite their lower sequence number, the B-4As would be delivered last. These were the last canvas-and-wood biplane bombers ordered by the Air Corps.

The performance of the B-6A varied little from the Martin NBS-1 ordered in 1921. Its successor, the monoplane bomber, had a hard time getting accepted. The Douglas Y1B-7 and Fokker XB-8 were originally designed as high-speed reconnaissance aircraft.

Operational history

The B-6A together with B-5A were front line bombers of the United States for the period between 1930 and 1934. Afterwards, they remained in service primarily as observation aircraft until the early 1940s.

B-6 aircraft were used, along with many other Army Air Corps planes, as mail planes in what became the Air Mail scandal of 1934.

On December 27, 1935, six B-6 bombers of the 23rd Bomb Squadron based in Hawaii dropped bombs to divert lava flow from the volcano Mauna Loa away from the port of Hilo.

On 10 February, the squadron's B-6As made four similar fights to Tangier Island and one to Smith Island. The flights followed a supply flight to Tangier Island by the Goodyear Blimp Enterprise on 2 February 1936. After the success of the B-6A flights, the 49th Bomb Squadron flew additional flights to drop supplies to the islands using 13 Martin B-10B bombers.<ref>[https://books.google.com/books?id=OsIBdVV_YOAC&dq=Goodyear+blimp+%22tangier+island%22+1936&pg=PA43 Bentley, Stewart W., Jr., PhD., "The Touch of Greatness: Colonel William C. Bentley, Jr., USAAC/USAF; Aviation Pioneer], Bloomington, Indiana: AuthorHouse, 2010, pp. 41–42.</ref>

Variants
LB-13
Seven aircraft ordered but delivered as the Y1B-4 and Y1B-6 with different engine installations.
Y1B-6
Two pre-production aircraft and three converted B-3As, as the LB-10 but with two  Wright R-1820-1 engines.
B-6A
Production version of the Y1B-6, 39 built.

Operators

United States Army Air Corps

Specifications (B-6A)

See also

References
Notes

Bibliography

 Wagner, Ray. American Combat Planes''. New York: Doubleday, 1982. .

External links

USAF Museum article on B-6
USAF Museum article on LB-13

Keystone B-06
B-6
Biplanes
Twin piston-engined tractor aircraft